Ehtiram Shahverdiyev (born on 1 October 1996) is an Azerbaijani professional footballer who plays as a winger for Gabala in the Azerbaijan Premier League.

Career

Club
On 23 April 2016, Shahverdiyev made his debut in the Azerbaijan Premier League for Gabala match against Khazar Lankaran.

References

External links
 

1996 births
Living people
Association football midfielders
Azerbaijani footballers
Azerbaijan under-21 international footballers
Azerbaijan youth international footballers
Azerbaijan Premier League players
Gabala FC players
Sumgayit FK players